Anwar Pasha Turki (8 August 1926 – 22 February 2004) was a Pakistani boxer. He competed at the 1948 Summer Olympics and the 1952 Summer Olympics.

References

External links
 

1926 births
2004 deaths
Pakistani male boxers
Olympic boxers of Pakistan
Boxers at the 1948 Summer Olympics
Boxers at the 1952 Summer Olympics
Place of birth missing
Welterweight boxers
20th-century Pakistani people